The Carcharodini are a tribe in the skipper butterfly subfamily Pyrginae. They are a very diverse but quite plesiomorphic and inconspicuous group distributed throughout the tropics.

Formerly, when only four tribes of Pyrginae were recognized, they were included in the Pyrgini, which at that time contained a massive number of genera. But the Pyrginae have since been reorganized to make them and their tribes monophyletic, leading most modern authors to treat the Carcharodini as distinct tribe. However, the old circumscription of the Pyrgini was by and large just as correct from a phylogenetic perspective.

The tribe of the Pyrgini sensu lato most closely related to the Pyrgini sensu stricto are the strikingly different Achlyodidini. As many consider it desirable to treat this lineage as a distinct tribe, the Carcharodini naturally need to be considered distinct too.

Genera
These genera belong to the tribe Carcharodini:

 Agyllia Grishin, 2020
 Arteurotia Butler & H. Druce, 1872
 Austinus Mielke & Casagrande, 2016
 Bolla Mabille, 1903
 Burca Bell & Comstock, 1948
 Carcharodus Hübner, [1819]
 Clytius Grishin, 2019
 Conognathus Felder & Felder, 1862
 Cyclosemia Mabille, 1878 (eyed skippers)
 Ernsta Grishin, 2020
 Favria Tutt, 1906
 Fuscocimex Austin, 2008
 Gomalia Moore, 1879 (marbled or African mallow skippers)
 Gorgopas Godman & Salvin, 1894
 Hesperopsis Dyar, 1905 (sootywings)
 Iliana Bell, 1937
 Incisus Grishin, 2019
 Jera Lindsey, 1925
 Mictris Evans, 1955
 Mimia Evans, 1953
 Morvina Evans, 1953
 Muschampia Tutt, 1906
 Myrinia Evans, 1953
 Nisoniades Hübner, 1819
 Noctuana E. Bell, 1937
 Ocella Evans, 1953
 Pachyneuria Mabille, 1888
 Pellicia Herrich-Schaffer, 1870
 Perus Grishin, 2019
 Pholisora Scudder, 1872 (sootywings)
 Polyctor Evans, 1953
 Sophista Plötz, 1879
 Spialia Swinhoe, 1912 (grizzled skippers & sandmen)
 Staphylus Godman & Salvin, 1896 (scallopwings)
 Viola Evans, 1953 (Viola skippers)
 Viuria Grishin, 2019
 Windia H. Freeman, 1969
 Xispia Lindsey, 1925

Footnotes

References

  (2009): Tree of Life Web Project – Carcharodini. Version of 2009-JUN-14. Retrieved 2009-DEC-26.

 

Taxa named by Ruggero Verity
Butterfly tribes